The 1980–81 Virginia Cavaliers men's basketball team represented University of Virginia and was a member of the Atlantic Coast Conference.

Roster

Schedule 

|-
!colspan=9 style="background:#00214e; color:#f56d22;"| Regular season

|-
!colspan=9 style="background:#00214e; color:#f56d22;"| ACC Tournament

|-
!colspan=9 style="background:#00214e; color:#f56d22;"| NCAA Tournament

Awards and honors
 Ralph Sampson, Adolph Rupp Trophy
 Ralph Sampson, AP Player of the Year
 Ralph Sampson, Naismith College Player of the Year
 Ralph Sampson, USBWA College Player of the Year
 Ralph Sampson, UPI Player of the Year
 Ralph Sampson, Consensus 1st Team All-American
 Ralph Sampson, ACC Player of the Year
 Ralph Sampson, 1st Team All-ACC
 Jeff Lamp, Consensus 2nd Team All-American
 Jeff Lamp, 1st Team All-ACC

NBA draft

References

Virginia Cavaliers men's basketball seasons
Virginia
NCAA Division I men's basketball tournament Final Four seasons
Virginia
Virgin
Virgin